Koshovicë (romanized: Kosovítsa/Kossovítsa) is a village in Gjirokastër County, southern Albania. At the 2015 local government reform it became part of the municipality of Dropull. It is inhabited solely by Greeks.

St. Mary's Monastery Church, located within the village, is a Religious Cultural Monument of Albania.

Demographics 
According to Ottoman statistics, the village had 188 inhabitants in 1895. The village had 864 inhabitants in 1993, all ethnically Greeks.

References

External links 
Photo and video compilation of the village

Villages in Gjirokastër County
Greek communities in Albania